Food safety (or food hygiene) is used as a scientific method/discipline describing handling, preparation, and storage of food in ways that prevent food-borne illness. The occurrence of two or more cases of a similar illness resulting from the ingestion of a common food is known as a food-borne disease outbreak. This includes a number of routines that should be followed to avoid potential health hazards. In this way, food safety often overlaps with food defense to prevent harm to consumers. The tracks within this line of thought are safety between industry and the market and then between the market and the consumer. In considering industry to market practices, food safety considerations include the origins of food including the practices relating to food labeling, food hygiene, food additives and pesticide residues, as well as policies on biotechnology and food and guidelines for the management of governmental import and export inspection and certification systems for foods. In considering market to consumer practices, the usual thought is that food ought to be safe in the market and the concern is safe delivery and preparation of the food for the consumer. Food safety, nutrition and food security are closely related. Unhealthy food creates a cycle of disease and malnutrition that affects infants and adults as well.

Food can transmit pathogens which can result in the illness or death of the person or other animals. The main types of pathogens are bacteria, viruses, parasites, and fungus. Food can also serve as a growth and reproductive medium for pathogens. In developed countries there are intricate standards for food preparation, whereas in lesser developed countries there are fewer standards and less enforcement of those standards. Even so, in the US, in 1999, 5,000 deaths per year were related to foodborne pathogens.  Another main issue is simply the availability of adequate safe water, which is usually a critical item in the spreading of diseases. In theory, food poisoning is 100% preventable. However this cannot be achieved due to the number of persons involved in the supply chain, as well as the fact that pathogens can be introduced into foods no matter how many precautions are taken.

Issues

Food safety issues and regulations concern:
 Agriculture and animal husbandry practices
 Food manufacturing practices
 Food additives
 Novel foods
 Genetically modified foods
 Food label
 Food contamination

Food contamination 
Food contamination happens when foods are corrupted with another substance. It can happen In the process of production, transportation, packaging, storage, sales, and cooking process. Contamination can be physical, chemical, or biological.

Physical contamination 
Physical contaminants (or ‘foreign bodies’) are objects such as hair, plant stalks or pieces of plastic and metal. When a foreign object enters food, it is a physical contaminant. If the foreign objects are bacteria, both a physical and biological contamination will occur.

Common sources of physical contaminations are: hair, glass or metal, pests, jewelry, dirt, and fingernails.

Physical food contamination is a hazardous yet natural accident of contaminating food with dangerous objects around the kitchen or production base when being prepared. If kitchens or other places where food may be prepared are unsanitary, it is very likely that physical contamination will occur and cause negative consequences. Dangerous objects such as glass and wire may be found in food which can cause many issues with the individuals who consume it including choking, breaking of teeth and cutting the insides of the body. Children and the elderly are at the highest risk of being harmed by food contamination due to their weaker immune systems and fragile structures.  The most common reasoning for physical contamination to occur is when the food is left uncovered without lids. To prevent such contamination and harm to those consuming food from restaurants, cooks are recommended to wear hair nets, remove jewelry, and wear gloves when necessary, especially over wounds with bandages.

Chemical contamination 
Chemical contamination happens when food is contaminated with a natural or artificial chemical substance. Common sources of chemical contamination can include: pesticides, herbicides, veterinary drugs, contamination from environmental sources (water, air or soil pollution), cross-contamination during food processing, migration from food packaging materials, presence of natural toxins, or use of unapproved food additives and adulterants.

Biological contamination 
It happens when the food has been contaminated by substances produced by living creatures, such as humans, rodents, pests or microorganisms. This includes bacterial contamination, viral contamination, or parasite contamination that is transferred through saliva, pest droppings, blood or fecal matter. Bacterial contamination is the most common cause of food poisoning worldwide. If an environment is high in starch or protein, water, oxygen, has a neutral pH level, and maintains a temperature between 5°C and 60°C (danger zone) for even a brief period of time (~0–20 minutes), bacteria are likely to survive.

Example of biological contamination: Tainted Romaine Lettuce

In April and May 2018, 26 states in the United States suffered an outbreak of the bacteria strain E. coli O157:H7. Several investigations show the contamination might have come from the Yuma, Arizona, growing region. This outbreak, which began April 10, is the largest US flare-up of E. coli in a decade. One person in California has died. At least 14 of the people affected developed kidney failure. The most common symptoms of E. coli include diarrhea, bloody diarrhea, abdominal pain, nausea and vomiting.

Safe food handling procedures (from market to consumer)
The five key principles of food hygiene, according to WHO, are:
 Prevent contaminating food with pathogens spreading from people, pets, and pests.
 Separate raw and cooked foods to prevent contaminating the cooked foods.
 Cook foods for the appropriate length of time and at the appropriate temperature to kill pathogens.
 Store food at the proper temperature.
 Use safe water and safe raw materials.
Proper storage, sanitary tools and work spaces, heating and cooling properly and to adequate temperatures, and avoiding contact with other uncooked foods can greatly reduce the chances of contamination. Tightly sealed water and air proof containers are good measures to limit the chances of both physical and biological contamination during storage. Using clean, sanitary surfaces and tools, free of debris, chemicals, standing liquids, and other food types (different than the kind currently being prepared, i.e. mixing vegetables/meats or beef/poultry) can help reduce the chance of all forms of contamination. However, even if all precautions have been taken and the food has been safely prepared and stored, bacteria can still form over time during storage. Food should be consumed within one to seven (1-7) days while it has been stored in a cold environment, or one to twelve (1-12) months if it was in a frozen environment (if it was frozen immediately after preparation). The length of time before a food becomes unsafe to eat depends on the type of food it is, the surrounding environment, and the method with which it is kept out of the danger zone.
 Always refrigerate perishable food within 2 hours—1 hour when the temperature is above 90°F (32.2°C).
 Check the temperature of your refrigerator and freezer with an appliance thermometer. The refrigerator should be at 40°F (4.4°C) or below and the freezer at 0°F (-17.7°C) or below.

For example, liquid foods like soup kept in a hot slow cooker (149°F or 65°C) may last only a few hours before contamination, but fresh meats like beef and lamb that are promptly frozen (-2°C) can last up to a year. The geographical location can also be a factor if it is in close proximity to wildlife. Animals like rodents and insects can infiltrate a container or prep area if left unattended. Any food that has been stored while in an exposed environment should be carefully inspected before consuming, especially if it was at risk of being in contact with animals. Consider all forms of contamination when deciding if a food is safe or unsafe, as some forms or contamination will not leave any apparent signs. Bacteria may not be visible to the naked eye, debris (physical contamination) may be underneath the surface of a food, and chemicals may be clear or tasteless; the contaminated food may not change in smell, texture, appearance, or taste, and could still be contaminated. Any foods deemed contaminated should be disposed of immediately, and any surrounding food should be checked for additional contamination.

ISO 22000 is a standard developed by the International Organization for Standardization dealing with food safety. This is a general derivative of ISO 9000.
The ISO 22000 international standard specifies the requirements for a food safety management system that involves interactive communication, system management, prerequisite programs, HACCP principles. ISO 22000 was first published in 2005. It is the culmination of all previous attempts from many sources and areas of food safety concern to provide an end product that is safe as possible from pathogens and other contaminants. Every 5 years standards are reviewed to determine whether a revision is necessary, to ensure that the standards remain as relevant and useful to businesses as possible.

Incidence

A 2003 World Health Organization (WHO) report concluded that about 30% of reported food poisoning outbreaks in the WHO European Region occur in private homes. According to the WHO and CDC, in the USA alone, annually, there are 76 million cases of foodborne illness leading to 325,000 hospitalizations and 5,000 deaths.

Regulations by jurisdiction and agency

WHO and FAO
In 1963, the WHO and FAO published the Codex Alimentarius which serves as an guideline to food safety.

However, according to Unit 04 - Communication of Health & Consumers Directorate-General of the European Commission (SANCO):
"The Codex, while being recommendations for voluntary application by members, Codex standards serve in many cases as a basis for national legislation. The reference made to Codex food safety standards in the World Trade Organizations' Agreement on Sanitary and Phytosanitary measures (SPS Agreement) means that Codex has far reaching implications for resolving trade disputes. WTO members that wish to apply stricter food safety measures than those set by Codex may be required to justify these measures scientifically."
So, an agreement made in 2003, signed by all member states, inclusive all EU, in the codex Stan Codex 240 – 2003  for coconut milk, sulphite containing additives like E223 and E 224 are allowed till 30 mg/kg, does NOT mean, they are allowed into the EU, see Rapid Alert System for Food and Feed (RASFF) entries from Denmark: 2012.0834; 2011.1848; en 2011.168, "sulphite unauthorised in coconut milk from Thailand ". Same for polysorbate E 435: see 2012.0838 from Denmark, unauthorised polysorbates in coconut milk and, 2007.AIC from France. Only for the latter the EU amended its regulations with (EU) No 583/2012 per 2 July 2012 to allow this additive, already used for decades and absolutely necessary.

Australia

Food Standards Australia New Zealand requires all food businesses to implement food safety systems. These systems are designed to ensure food is safe to consume and halt the increasing incidence of food poisoning, and they include basic food safety training for at least one person in each business.
Food safety training is delivered in various forms by, among other organisations, Registered Training Organisations (RTOs), after which staff are issued a nationally recognised unit of competency code on their certificate.
Basic food safety training includes:
 Understanding the hazards associated with the main types of food and the conditions to prevent the growth of bacteria which can cause food poisoning and to prevent illness.
 Potential problems associated with product packaging such as leaks in vacuum packs, damage to packaging or pest infestation, as well as problems and diseases spread by pests.
 Safe food handling. This includes safe procedures for each process such as receiving, re-packing, food storage, preparation and cooking, cooling and re-heating, displaying products, handling products when serving customers, packaging, cleaning and sanitizing, pest control, transport and delivery. Also covers potential causes of cross contamination.
 Catering for customers who are particularly at risk of food-borne illness, as well as those with allergies or intolerance.
 Correct cleaning and sanitizing procedures, cleaning products and their correct use, and the storage of cleaning items such as brushes, mops and cloths.
 Personal hygiene, hand washing, illness, and protective clothing.

Food safety standards and requirements  are set out at the national level in the Food Standards Code, and brought into force in each state and territory by state-based Acts and Regulations. Legislation means that people responsible for selling or serving unsafe food may be liable for heavy fines.

China

Food safety is a growing concern in Chinese agriculture. The Chinese government oversees agricultural production as well as the manufacture of food packaging, containers, chemical additives, drug production, and business regulation. In recent years, the Chinese government attempted to consolidate food regulation with the creation of the State Food and Drug Administration in 2003, and officials have also been under increasing public and international pressure to solve food safety problems. However, it appears that regulations are not well known by the trade. Labels used for "green" food, "organic" food and "pollution-free" food are not well recognized by traders and many are unclear about their meaning. A survey by the World Bank found that supermarket managers had difficulty in obtaining produce that met safety requirements and found that a high percentage of produce did not comply with established standards.

Traditional marketing systems, whether in China or the rest of Asia, presently provide little motivation or incentive for individual farmers to make improvements to either quality or safety as their produce tends to get grouped together with standard products as it progresses through the marketing channel. Direct linkages between farmer groups and traders or ultimate buyers, such as supermarkets, can help avoid this problem. Governments need to improve the condition of many markets through upgrading management and reinvesting market fees in physical infrastructure. Wholesale markets need to investigate the feasibility of developing separate sections to handle fruits and vegetables that meet defined safety and quality standards.

European Union
The parliament of the European Union (EU) makes legislation in the form of directives and regulations, many of which are mandatory for member states and which therefore must be incorporated into individual countries' national legislation.  As a very large organisation that exists to remove barriers to trade between member states, and into which individual member states have only a proportional influence, the outcome is often seen as an excessively bureaucratic 'one size fits all' approach.  However, in relation to food safety the tendency to err on the side of maximum protection for the consumer may be seen as a positive benefit.  The EU parliament is informed on food safety matters by the European Food Safety Authority.

Individual member states may also have other legislation and controls in respect of food safety, provided that they do not prevent trade with other states, and can differ considerably in their internal structures and approaches to the regulatory control of food safety.

From 13 December 2014, new legislation - the EU Food Information for Consumers Regulation 1169/2011 - require food businesses to provide allergy information on food sold unpackaged, in for example catering outlets, deli counters, bakeries and sandwich bars. A further addition to the 2014 legislation, named 'Natasha's Law' will come into force on 1st October in the UK and NI. Following the death of Natasha Ednan-Laperouse, who died after eating a sandwich containing the allergen sesame, foods pre-packed on premises for direct sale will require individual ingredients labelling - this replaces the historic requirement for outlets to provide ingredients information for these types of food upon request.

France 
Agence nationale de sécurité sanitaire de l'alimentation, de l'environnement et du travail (ANSES) is a French governmental agency dealing with food safety.

Germany 
The Federal Ministry of Food, Agriculture and Consumer Protection (BMEL) is a Federal Ministry of the Federal Republic of Germany.
History: Founded as Federal Ministry of Food, Agriculture and Foresting in 1949, this name did not change until 2001. Then the name changed to Federal Ministry of Consumer Protection, Food and Agriculture. At 22 November 2005, the name got changed again to its current state: Federal Ministry of Food, Agriculture and Consumer Protection. The reason for this last change was that all the resorts should get equal ranking which was achieved by sorting the resorts alphabetically.
Vision: A balanced and healthy diet with safe food, distinct consumer rights and consumer information for various areas of life, and a strong and sustainable agriculture as well as perspectives for our rural areas are important goals of the Federal Ministry of Food, Agriculture and Consumer Protection (BMELV).
The Federal Office of Consumer Protection and Food Safety is under the control of the Federal Ministry of Food, Agriculture and Consumer Protection. It exercises several duties, with which it contributes to safer food and thereby intensifies health-based consumer protection in Germany. Food can be manufactured and sold within Germany without a special permission, as long as it does not cause any damage on consumers’ health and meets the general standards set by the legislation. However, manufacturers, carriers, importers and retailers are responsible for the food they pass into circulation. They are obliged to ensure and document the safety and quality of their food with the use of in-house control mechanisms.

Greece
In Greece, the Hellenic Food Authority (EFET) governing body supervised by the Ministry of the Environment and Energy (Greek: Υπουργείο Περιβάλλοντος και Ενέργειας), it is in charge of ensuring food sold is safe and fit for consumption. It controls the food business operators including agricultural producers, food processors, retailers, caterers, input material suppliers and private laboratories.

Hong Kong
In Hong Kong SAR, the Food and Environmental Hygiene Department is in charge of ensuring food sold is safe and fit for consumption.

Hungary 
In Hungary, the National Food Chain Safety Office controls the food business operators including agricultural producers, food processors, retailers, caterers, input material suppliers and private laboratories. Its activities also cover risk assessment, risk communication and related research.

India
Food Safety and Standards Authority of India, established under the Food Safety and Standards Act, 2006, is the regulating body related to food safety and laying down of standards of food in India.

New Zealand

The New Zealand Food Safety Authority (NZFSA), or Te Pou Oranga Kai O Aotearoa is the New Zealand government body responsible for food safety. NZFSA is also the controlling authority for imports and exports of food and food-related products.  The NZFSA as of 2012 is now a division of the Ministry for Primary Industries (MPI) and is no longer its own organization.

Pakistan
The Pure Food Ordinance 1960 consolidates and amends the law in relation to the preparation and the sale of foods. Its aim is to ensure purity of food being supplied to people in the market and, therefore, provides for preventing adulteration.

Pakistan Hotels and Restaurant Act, 1976 applies to all hotels and restaurants in Pakistan and seeks to control and regulate the standard of service(s) by hotels and restaurants. In addition to other provisions, under section 22(2), the sale of food or beverages that are contaminated, not prepared hygienically or served in utensils that are not hygienic or clean is an offense.

South Korea

Korea Food & Drug Administration
Korea Food & Drug Administration (KFDA) is working for food safety since 1945. It is part of the Government of South Korea.

IOAS-Organic Certification Bodies Registered in KFDA: "Organic" or related claims can be labelled on food products when organic certificates are considered as valid by KFDA. KFDA admits organic certificates which can be issued by 1) IFOAM (International Federation of Organic Agriculture Movement) accredited certification bodies 2) Government accredited certification bodies – 328 bodies in 29 countries have been registered in KFDA.

Food Import Report: According to Food Import Report, it is supposed to report or register what you import. Competent authority is as follows:

National Institute of Food and Drug Safety Evaluation
National Institute of Food and Drug Safety Evaluation (NIFDS) is functioning as well.
The National Institute of Food and Drug Safety Evaluation is a national organization for toxicological tests and research. Under the Korea Food & Drug Administration, the Institute performs research on toxicology, pharmacology, and risk analysis of foods, drugs, and their additives. The Institute strives primarily to understand important biological triggering mechanisms and improve assessment methods of human exposure, sensitivities, and risk by (1) conducting basic, applied, and policy research that closely examines biologically triggering harmful effects on the regulated products such as foods, food additives, and drugs, and  operating the national toxicology program for the toxicological test development and inspection of hazardous chemical substances assessments. The Institute ensures safety by  investigation and research on safety by its own researchers,  contract research by external academicians and research centers.

Taiwan
In Taiwan, the Ministry of Health and Welfare in charge of Food and Drug Safety, also evaluate the catering industry to maintenance the food product quality. Currently, US $29.01 million budget is allocated each year for food safety-related efforts.

Turkey
In Turkey, the Ministry of Agriculture and Forestry, is in charge of food safety and they provide their mission as "to ensure access to safe food and high-quality agricultural products needed by Turkey and world markets" among other responsibilities. The institution itself has research and reference laboratories across the country helping the control and inspection of food safety as well as reviewing and updating the current regulations and laws about food safety constantly.

United Kingdom
In the UK the Food Standards Agency is an independent government department responsible for food safety and hygiene across the UK. They work with businesses to help them produce safe food, and with local authorities to enforce food safety regulations. In 2006 food hygiene legislation changed and new requirements came into force. The main requirement resulting from this change is that anyone who owns or run a food business in the UK must have a documented Food Safety Management System, which is based on the principles of Hazard Analysis Critical Control Point HACCP. Furthermore, according to UK legislation, food handlers and their supervisors must be adequately trained in food safety. Although food handlers are not legally obliged to hold a certificate they must be able to demonstrate to a health officer that they received training on the job, have prior experience, and have completed self-study. In practice, the self-study component is covered via a Food Hygiene & Safety certificate. Common occupations which fall under this obligation are Nannys, childminders, teachers, food manufacturers, chefs, cooks and catering staff.

In early 2019, as part of US-UK negotiations to arrive at a trade deal prior to Brexit, the Trump administration asked the UK to eliminate its existing ban on chlorinated chicken, genetically modified plants and hormone-injected beef, products that the US would like to sell in the UK.

United States

The US food system is regulated by numerous federal, state and local officials. Since 1906 tremendous progress has been made in producing safer foods as can be seen in the section below. Still, it has been criticized as lacking in "organization, regulatory tools, and not addressing food borne illness".

Federal level regulation 
The Food and Drug Administration (FDA) publishes the Food Code, a model set of guidelines and procedures that assists food control jurisdictions by providing a scientifically sound technical and legal basis for regulating the retail and food service industries, including restaurants, grocery stores and institutional foodservice providers such as nursing homes. Regulatory agencies at all levels of government in the United States use the FDA Food Code to develop or update food safety rules in their jurisdictions that are consistent with national food regulatory policy. According to the FDA, 48 of 56 states and territories, representing 79% of the US population, have adopted food codes patterned after one of the five versions of the Food Code, beginning with the 1993 edition.

In the United States, federal regulations governing food safety are fragmented and complicated, according to a February 2007 report from the Government Accountability Office. There are 15 agencies sharing oversight responsibilities in the food safety system, although the two primary agencies are the US Department of Agriculture (USDA) Food Safety and Inspection Service (FSIS), which is responsible for the safety of meat, poultry, and processed egg products, and the FDA, which is responsible for virtually all other foods.

The Food Safety and Inspection Service has approximately 7,800 inspection program personnel working in nearly 6,200 federally inspected meat, poultry and processed egg establishments. FSIS is charged with administering and enforcing the Federal Meat Inspection Act, the Poultry Products Inspection Act, the Egg Products Inspection Act, portions of the Agricultural Marketing Act, the Humane Slaughter Act, and the regulations that implement these laws. FSIS inspection program personnel inspect every animal before slaughter, and each carcass after slaughter to ensure public health requirements are met.  In fiscal year (FY) 2008, this included about 50 billion pounds of livestock carcasses, about 59 billion pounds of poultry carcasses, and about 4.3 billion pounds of processed egg products. At US borders, they also inspected 3.3 billion pounds of imported meat and poultry products.

US legislation history 

Recognition of food safety issues and attempts to address them began after Upton Sinclair published the novel The Jungle in 1906. It was a fictional account of the lives of immigrants in the industrial cities in the US around this time. Sinclair spent nine months undercover as an employee in a Chicago meat plant doing research. The book inadvertently raised public concern about food safety and sanatization of the Chicago meat packing industry. Upon reading The Jungle, President Theodore Roosevelt called on Congress to pass the Pure Food and Drug Act and the Federal Meat Inspection Act (FMIA), which passed in 1906 and 1907 respectively. These laws were the first to address food safety in the US Misbranding and adulteration were defined as they concerned food additives and truth in labeling. Food preservatives such as formaldehyde and borax used to disguise unsanitary production processes were also addressed.

The first test and major court battle involving the Pure Food and Drug Act was United States v. Forty Barrels and Twenty Kegs of Coca-Cola, an attempt to outlaw Coca-Cola due to its excessive caffeine content. The Meat Inspection Act led to the formation of the Food and Drug Administration (FDA). Between 1906 and 1938, acts were created that monitored food coloration additives, and other chemical additives such as preservatives, as well as food labeling and food marketing.

During the winter of 1924–1925, the worst food-borne illness to date in the US occurred because of improper handling of oysters. This produced a typhoid fever epidemic, and food-borne illness outbreaks gained national attention. Unfortunately, it was not until 1969 that the FDA began sanitization programs specifically for shellfish and milk, and began its focus and implementation on the food service industry as a whole.

In 1970 the Centers for Disease Control and Prevention (CDC) began keeping records on food-borne illness deaths. This was the beginning of effective record keeping that could be used to control and prevent similar outbreaks in the future. The first major food recall in the US was caused by canned mushrooms in 1973. This outbreak of botulism produced the National Botulism Surveillance System. This system collected the data on all confirmed cases of botulism in the US This led to processing regulations for low-acid foods to ensure proper heat treating of canned foods. The Jack in the Box E. coli outbreak of 1993 led the Clinton administration to put $43 million into the Food Safety Initiative to create many of the common specific regulations in place today. This initiative produced regulations on seafood, meat, poultry, and shell-eggs. This initiative produced a program for DNA fingerprinting to help track outbreaks and to determine their source. It also called for a cooperative detection and response effort between the CDC, FDA, USDA and local agencies called FoodNet.

In 2011 the Food Safety Modernization Act (FSMA) produced what is considered the most significant food safety legislation in over 70 years. The significant difference between this and previous acts was that it shifted to focus from response and containment of food-borne disease outbreaks to their prevention. This act is still in the early implementation phase but gives the FDA authority to regulate the way foods are grown, processed, and harvested.

Industry pressure
There have been concerns over the efficacy of safety practices and food industry pressure on US regulators. A study reported by Reuters found that "the food industry is jeopardizing US public health by withholding information from food safety investigators or pressuring regulators to withdraw or alter policy designed to protect consumers". A 2010 survey found that 25% of US government inspectors and scientists surveyed had experienced during the past year corporate interests forcing their food safety agency to withdraw or to modify agency policy or action that protects consumers. Scientists observed that management undercuts field inspectors who stand up for food safety against industry pressure. According to Dr. Dean Wyatt, a USDA veterinarian who oversees federal slaughterhouse inspectors, "Upper level management does not adequately support field inspectors and the actions they take to protect the food supply. Not only is there lack of support, but there's outright obstruction, retaliation and abuse of power." A growing number of food and beverage manufacturers are improving food safety standards by incorporating a food safety management system which automates all steps in the food quality management process.

State and local regulation

A number of US states have their own meat inspection programs that substitute for USDA inspection for meats that are sold only in-state. Certain state programs have been criticized for undue leniency to bad practices. Contrastingly, there are some state-level programs that supplement Federal inspections rather than replacing them. Said programs generally operate with the goal of increasing consumer confidence in their state's produce, play a role in investigating outbreaks of food-borne disease bacteria- such as in the 2006 outbreak of pathogenic Escherichia coli O157:H7- and promote better food processing practices to eliminate food-borne threats. Additionally, several states which are major producers of fresh fruits and vegetables (including California, Arizona and Florida) have their own state programs to test produce for pesticide residues.

The food system represents one of the most significant components of the U.S. economy. It affects the social and economic well-being of nearly all Americans and plays a significant role in the well-being of the global community. The U.S. food and fiber system accounted for 18 percent of employment 4 percent of imported goods, and 11 percent of exports in 2011. The relative economic contribution of each various step of the U.S. food supply chain has changed significantly over the past 100 years. Generally speaking, the economic importance of the farm production subsector has steadily diminished relative to the shares of the other components of the food supply chain.

Restaurants and other retail food establishments fall under state law and are regulated by state or local health departments. Typically these regulations require official inspections of specific design features, best food-handling practices, and certification of food handlers. In some places a letter grade or numerical score must be prominently posted following each inspection. In some localities, inspection deficiencies and remedial action are posted on the Internet. In addition, states may maintain and enforce their own model of the FDA Food Code. For example, California maintains the California Retail Food Code (CalCode), which is part of the Health and Safety Code and is based on most current and safe food handling practices in the retail industry.
It has been argued that restaurant hygiene ratings, though useful at times, are not informative enough for consumers.

Vietnam
The Vietnam Food Administration manages food hygiene, safety, and quality and has made significant progress since its establishment in 1999. Food safety remains a high priority in Vietnam with the growth of export markets and increasing food imports raising the need to rapidly build capacity of the Food Administration in order to reduce threats of foodborne disease. The Food Administration has demonstrated commitment to the food safety challenges it faces, and has embarked on an innovative capacity building activity with technical assistance from the World Health Organization.

Manufacturing control

HACCP guidelines 
Meat and Poultry manufacturers are required to have a HACCP plan in accordance with 9 CFR part 417.

Juice manufacturers are required to have a HACCP plan in accordance with 21 CFR part 120.

Seafood manufacturers are required to have a HACCP plan in accordance with 21 CFR part 123.

Consumer labeling

United Kingdom 
Foodstuffs in the UK have one of two labels to indicate the nature of the deterioration of the product and any subsequent health issues.  EHO Food Hygiene certification is required to prepare and distribute food.  While there is no specified expiry date of such a qualification the changes in legislation it is suggested to update every five years.

Best before indicates a future date beyond which the food product may lose quality in terms of taste or texture amongst others, but does not imply any serious health problems if food is consumed beyond this date (within reasonable limits).

Use by indicates a legal date beyond which it is not permissible to sell a food product (usually one that deteriorates fairly rapidly after production) due to the potential serious nature of consumption of pathogens. Leeway is sometimes provided by producers in stating display until dates so that products are not at their limit of safe consumption on the actual date stated (this latter is voluntary and not subject to regulatory control). This allows for the variability in production, storage and display methods.

United States
With the exception of infant formula and baby foods which must be withdrawn by their expiration date, Federal law does not require expiration dates. For all other foods, except dairy products in some states, freshness dating is strictly voluntary on the part of manufacturers. In response to consumer demand, perishable foods are typically labelled with a 'SELL BY' date. It is up to the consumer to decide how long after the 'SELL BY' date a package is usable. Other common dating statements are 'BEST IF USED BY' date, 'USE BY' date, 'EXPIRES/EXPIRATION' date, 'GUARANTEED FRESH' date, and 'PACKED/PACKED ON' dating. When used, freshness dating must be validated using AOAC International (Association of Official Analytical Collaboration International) guidelines. Although this dating requires product testing throughout the entire timeframe, accelerated shelf life testing, using elevated temperatures and humidity, can be used to determine shelf life before the long-term results can be completed.

Australia and New Zealand
Guide to Food Labelling and Other Information Requirements: This guide provides background information on the general labelling requirements in the Code. The information in this guide applies both to food for retail sale and to food for catering purposes. Foods for catering purposes means those foods for use in restaurants, canteens, schools, caterers or self-catering institutions, where food is offered for immediate consumption. Labelling and information requirements in the new Code apply both to food sold or prepared for sale in Australia and New Zealand and food imported into Australia and New Zealand.
Warning and Advisory Declarations, Ingredient Labelling, Date Marking, Nutrition Information Requirements, Legibility Requirements for Food Labels, Percentage Labelling, Information Requirements for Foods Exempt from Bearing a Label.

See also

 Adulterated food
 Aseptic processing
 Biosecurity
 Codex Alimentarius
 Danger zone (food safety)
 Directorate-General for Health and Food Safety
 European Food Safety Authority
 Five-second rule
 Food and Bioprocess Technology
 Food chemistry
 Food engineering
 Food grading
 Food microbiology
 Food packaging
 Food rheology
 Food Safety and Inspection Service
 Food Safety Authority (disambiguation)
 Food sampling
 Food spoilage
 Food technology
 Global Food Safety Initiative
 Infant food safety
 International Food Safety Network
 ISO 22000
 List of food safety organisations
 Optical sorting

References

Further reading
 
 
 

Journals
 Comprehensive Reviews in Food Science and Food Safety,  (electronic)  (paper), Blackwell Publishing
 Food Control, Elsevier
 Food and Chemical Toxicology, Elsevier
 Food Policy, Elsevier
 Journal of Food Protection, International Association for Food Protection
 Journal of Food Safety,  (electronic)  (paper), Blackwell Publishing
 Journal of Foodservice,  (electronic)  (paper), Blackwell Publishing
 Sensing and Instrumentation for Food Quality and Safety,  (electronic)  (paper), Springer
 Internet Journal of Food Safety, International Association for Food Safety/Quality

External links
 Food safety and quality at the Food and Agriculture Organization (FAO)

 
Foodservice
Product safety
Safety
Food politics
Food science